Blaque By Popular Demand is a ten track compilation album of Blaque's most popular songs. Some of the group's hit singles, ("808", "As If", "Bring It All to Me", and "Can't Get It Back") along with four selected tracks from their self-titled debut album and two remixes were featured on the compilation. Physical copies of the compilation were released to selected marketing stores such as Circuit City and were sold online via Amazon.

Track listing

3 Radio edit

Blaque albums
2007 compilation albums